Gideon "Doppies" la Grange (born 2 December 1981 in Sasolburg, South Africa) is a former South African rugby union footballer that played as a centre between 2003 and 2014.

Career

Golden Lions / Lions / Cats

Between 2003 and 2012, he made in excess of 100 appearances for the side in the domestic Currie Cup and Vodacom Cup competitions. He also played for their affiliated Super Rugby team – called the  until 2006 and the  since 2007 – during the same period, making 69 appearances and scoring five tries.

Treviso

He signed a two-year contract at Benetton Treviso prior to the 2012–13 Pro12 season. However, in October 2013, after an injury-ridden spell at Benetton Treviso, he left the club, having made just nine appearances and scoring two tries.

Griquas

He returned to South Africa to join  for a short spell during the 2014 Currie Cup Premier Division.

References

External links
 
 
 

1981 births
Living people
People from Sasolburg
Afrikaner people
South African rugby union players
Golden Lions players
Griquas (rugby union) players
Lions (United Rugby Championship) players
Rugby union centres
South African expatriate rugby union players
Expatriate rugby union players in Italy
South African expatriate sportspeople in Italy
Benetton Rugby players
Rugby union players from the Free State (province)